Martina Maria Anna Antonia "Tineke" Bartels-de Vries (born 6 February 1951 in Eindhoven) is an equestrian from the Netherlands, who won the silver medal in the Team Dressage Event at the 1992 Summer Olympics in Barcelona, Spain. She did so alongside Annemarie Sanders, Ellen Bontje, and Anky van Grunsven. In the Individual Competition she finished in fifteenth position.

Biography
Four years later Bartels repeated that feat, this time with Van Grunsven and the couple Gonnelien and Sven Rothenberger. She competed in four Summer Olympics for her native country, starting in 1984. Her daughter Imke competed at the 2004 Summer Olympics in Athens, Greece.

Bartels was heavily injured on 7 November 2006 after she fell off her horse during a training. She fell with her head against a tree and will need a long time to recover. It is unsure whether she can continue her career.

External links
 Dutch Olympic Committee

Dutch dressage riders
1951 births
Living people
Olympic equestrians of the Netherlands
Dutch female equestrians
Equestrians at the 1984 Summer Olympics
Equestrians at the 1988 Summer Olympics
Equestrians at the 1992 Summer Olympics
Equestrians at the 1996 Summer Olympics
Olympic silver medalists for the Netherlands
Sportspeople from Eindhoven
Olympic medalists in equestrian
Medalists at the 1996 Summer Olympics
Medalists at the 1992 Summer Olympics
20th-century Dutch women
20th-century Dutch people